Cyperus macrorrhizus is a species of sedge that is native to parts of north eastern Africa and parts of the Middle East.

See also 
 List of Cyperus species

References 

macrorrhizus
Plants described in 1834
Flora of Somalia
Flora of Sudan
Flora of Egypt
Flora of Iran
Flora of Israel
Taxa named by Christian Gottfried Daniel Nees von Esenbeck